Peenemünde Airfield  is an airfield along the Baltic Sea north of Peenemünde, Germany.  Today round trips in light aircraft take place from Peenemünde Airfield. Bus tours are also available, on which one can visit the former shelters of the NVA and the remnants of the V-1 flying bomb facilities. Because of its long runway the airfield Peenemünde is also a location for flight schools.

History

On April 2, 1936, the Reich Air Ministry paid  to the town of Wolgast for the whole Northern peninsula of Usedom. The airfield began service on 1 April 1938, and on the same date, the Air Ministry officially separated Peenemünde-West from the joint command that included the adjacent Army Research Center Peenemünde.

As Werk West, the Luftwaffe Test Site and under control from the central Erprobungsstelle Rechlin facility inland, the Peenemünde-West coastal facility was used for testing experimental aircraft (Erprobungsflugzeug) such as the Heinkel He 176 (flown at Peenemünde on June 20, 1939) and the Messerschmitt Me 163 rocket-powered fighter (code named 'Peenemünde 30' by British intelligence – the '30' referring to the object's measured wingspan in feet). At the northeast edge of the concrete airfield was a launch ramp for testing the V-1 flying bomb and on which, in 1943, RAF officer Constance Babington Smith, working at RAF Medmenham, detected a small winged aircraft ('Peenemünde 20') while viewing an Allied reconnaissance photograph. The airfield was also used for take-off of Heinkel He 111 for initial air-launch testing of V-1s. V-1 launch crew training was at the nearby resort of Zempin, and after the August 1943 Operation Hydra bombing of the area, V-1 flight testing was moved to Brüsterort. Peenemünde West also developed World War II night-navigation and radar systems (Dr. Johannes Plendl). After the 2nd Belorussian Front under General Konstantin Rokossovsky captured the Swinemünde port and Usedom island on May 5, 1945, the airfield became part of the Soviet Zone of Occupation.

Post-war
In 1956, the airfield received a new 2,465 metre-long concrete runway, which is oriented in a northwesterly direction and allows the operation of modern military jet planes. A further landmark is the collection of radio beacons at the northwest end, which were built on artificial islands in the sea. In 1961, the airfield was transferred to the National People's Army (NVA), which used it until 1990. Main unit was the Jagdfliegergeschwader 9 (JG-9) (English: Fighter Wing 9) with MiG-21 and later MiG-23 in different versions. From 1972 the Zieldarstellungskette 33 (ZDK-33) (roughly: Target Towing Flight 33) was also stationed at Peenemünde airfield. It was subordinated to the JG-9 and used Il-28 and later Aero L-39 to serve the anti-aircraft firing ranges Zingst and Ueckermünde. After 1990, the airfield was used among other things as parking area of former military vehicles of the NVA. From Summer 2010, a high-performance jet trainer aircraft Aero L-39 Albatros of the former National People's Army (NVA) is back on Peenemünde Airfield.

See also

Website of the Airfield (German)

References

External links

Airfield
Buildings and structures in Vorpommern-Greifswald
Research and development in Nazi Germany
V-1 flying bomb facilities
German V-2 rocket facilities
World War II sites in Germany
World War II sites of Nazi Germany
Government buildings completed in 1938
Military airbases established in 1938
1938 establishments in Germany
20th century in Mecklenburg-Western Pomerania
Luftstreitkräfte airbases
Airports in Mecklenburg-Western Pomerania